Constantin is an Aromanian, Megleno-Romanian and Romanian male given name. It can also be a surname. 

For a list of notable people called Constantin, see Constantine (name).

See also
 Constantine (name)
 Konstantin

References

Aromanian masculine given names
Megleno-Romanian masculine given names
Romanian masculine given names
Romanian-language surnames